Aisling Chin-Yee (born 1982) is a Canadian film director, writer, and producer, who works primarily in Montreal and Los Angeles. In addition to her work as a producer, Chin-Yee directed the films The Rest of Us (2019) and No Ordinary Man (2020).

Early life and education
Chin-Yee was born in Halifax, Nova Scotia. In 2004, Chin-Yee graduated from Concordia University with a degree in Communication Studies and a minor in Film Studies, concentrating in film production, theory, and analysis.

Career
In 2006, Chin-Yee started her career as associate producer at the National Film Board of Canada. In 2010, she joined Prospector Films as producer.

Her short film, Sound Asleep (2014), premiered at Lucerne International Film Festival. In 2015, her documentary film, Synesthesia, won best short documentary at the Crossroads Film Festival. she co-created the #AfterMeToo movement in 2017 along with Mia Kirshner and Freya Ravensbergen that consisted of a symposium, a report, and fund in partnership with the Canadian Women's Foundation.

Chin-Yee's directorial debut feature film, The Rest of Us, starring Heather Graham, Sophie Nélisse and Jodi Balfour, premiered at the Toronto International Film Festival. She was nominated for best feature film editing by the Canadian Cinema Editors in 2020. In 2020, she co-directed the documentary feature film about Billy Tipton, No Ordinary Man, with Chase Joynt, which premiered at the Toronto International Film Festival.

She is represented by William Morris Endeavor Entertainment (WME) and Elevate Entertainment.

Personal life
Chin-Yee's was for sometime in the 2010s romantic partner with late filmmaker Jean-Marc Vallée, who died of arrhythmia on December 25, 2021. They met in 2015 at the Canadian Governor General's Awards for the Performing Arts.

Filmography

Awards and nominations

References

External links
 
 AfterMeToo
 

1982 births
Living people
Canadian women film directors
Canadian women film producers
Canadian women screenwriters
Canadian documentary film directors
Canadian documentary film producers
Film directors from Montreal
Film directors from Nova Scotia
Writers from Halifax, Nova Scotia
Writers from Montreal
Canadian people of Chinese descent
Canadian people of Irish descent
Asian-Canadian filmmakers
Canadian women documentary filmmakers